Mark A Gillman is a  South African scholar, neuroscientist, medical consultant and author. He is Emeritus CEO of the S.A. Brain Research Institute and an adviser on substance abuse for Governments in South Africa, the USA, China, and Israel.

Gillman is known primarily for his research on conscious sedation with nitrous oxide/oxygen.

Early life and education
Gillman pursued his bachelor’s degree in dental science from Wits University. He completed his Doctorate in  Pharmacology at the Potchefstroom University.

Career
Gillman was the CEO of the S.A. Brain Research Institute from 1982 to 2013, when he retired. He was also an adviser on substance abuse to Governments in South Africa, the USA, China, and Israel.

Over the years, Gillman has published over 300 papers along with five full-length books and a best-selling electronic presentation-textbook on the technique of conscious sedation with nitrous oxide.

As a renowned scholar, Gillman has lectured at several institutions such as the University of Witwatersrand, Medunsa, Hadassah Medical Schools in Jerusalem and Albert Einstein University Medical School in New York. He has addressed over 250 academic and lay audiences on conscious sedation with nitrous oxide and stress management both locally and internationally.

Gillman has been featured in several media outlets, news channels, and such as BBC, and academic journals like Lancet, BMJ, International Journal of Neuroscience, Biological Psychiatry, and others.

Gillman, along with his colleagues at the S.A. Brain Research Institute, discovered the new principle of biology called Gaseous neurotransmission.

He was also an integral member of the team that first proved the first biological link in continuum linking pain and pleasure that was first postulated by Aristotle, followed by Descartes and Spinoza.

Gillman also led a team that helped to uncover endorphin links to human sexual response, anorexia nervosa, Tourette syndrome, and a treatment for substance abuse with nitrous oxide sedation used in South Africa and Scandinavia. 
 
Gillman, along with Lichtigfeld, also discovered a new treatment for substance abuse with N2O sedation that was first used in SABRI and later in Europe, the USA, and China.

Books
Haynes C, Gillman MA (1992) Death the Last Great Adventure. Bizbee, U.S.A: Nomad Press.

Gillman MA (1996) Envy as a retarding force in science. U.K. Aldershot: Avebury.
Gillman MA (2004) Psychotropic Analgesic Nitrous Oxide (PAN) Sedation 1st Edition – Textbook (in CD form).
Gillman MA (2006) Psychotropic Analgesic Nitrous Oxide (PAN) Sedation 2nd Edition – Textbook (in CD form). Johannesburg: Cerebrum Publishers.
Gillman MA (2008) Psychotropic Analgesic Nitrous Oxide (PAN) Sedation 3rd Edition – Textbook (in CD form). Johannesburg: Cerebrum Publishers.
Gillman MA (2019) Psychotropic Analgesic Nitrous Oxide (PAN) Sedation 4th Edition – Textbook (in CD form). USA|: Udemy.com
Gillman MA (2010) Using Nitrous Oxide/Oxygen (PAN) sedation for treating nicotine dependence: A manual for Health Professionals. Johannesburg: Cerebrum Publishers.
Gillman MA (2012) Nitrous oxide and neurotransmission. New York: Novo Science.
Gillman MA (2018) How the brain controls all pleasures including sex, food, drugs, rock ‘n roll and others.

Selected publications
Gillman MA, Lichtigfeld FJ (1980) Nitrous oxide: treatment of withdrawal symptoms.  Lancet 2: 803.
Gillman MA, Kok L, Lichtigfeld FJ (1980) Paradoxical effect of naloxone on nitrous oxide analgesia in man. Eur J Pharmacol 61: 175-177.
Gillman MA, Lichtigfeld FJ (1981) A comparison of the effect of morphine sulphate and nitrous oxide analgesia on chronic pain states in man. J Neurol Sci 45: 41-45 
Sandyk R, Gillman MA (1986) The opioid system in the restless legs and nocturnal myoclonus Syndromes.  Sleep 9: 370-371
Gillman MA, Sandyk R(1984) Hemifacial spasm - successful treatment with Baclofen.  S Afr Med J 65: 502
Gillman MA (1984) The hypertensive response to naloxone - A Commentary.  S Afr Med J 66: 551-552
Sandyk R, Gillman MA (1984) Motor dysfunction following chronic exposure to a fluoroalkane solvent mixture containing nitromethane.  Eur Neurol 23: 479 – 480
Gillman MA. (2012) Psychotropic Analgesic Nitrous oxide (PAN) also an opioid: Beneficial action in substance abuse. Frontiers of Psychiatry
Gillman MA, Lichtigfeld FJ, Young T. (2008) Psychotropic analgesic nitrous oxide for alcoholic withdrawal states. (Review). The Cochrane Library, Issue 4.
Gillman MA (2012). Comment on: Opinion: Academia Suppresses Creativity. The Scientist 
Gillman MA. Early history and pioneers of procedural sedation and Analgesia. International Journal of Anesthesiology Research. 7: 1-5, 2019.

References

South African chief executives
1943 births
Living people